The Kapuas River (or Kapoeas River) is a river in the Indonesian part of Borneo island, at the geographic center of Maritime Southeast Asia. At  in length, it is the longest river in the island of Borneo and the longest river of Indonesia and one of the world's longest island rivers. It originates in the Müller mountain range at the center of the island and flows west into the South China Sea creating an extended marshy delta. The delta is located west-southwest of Pontianak, the capital of the West Kalimantan province. This Kapuas River should be distinguished from another Kapuas River, which starts on the other side of the same mountain range in central Borneo, but flows to the south, merging with the Barito River and discharging into the Java Sea.

Geography and hydrology
The average annual rainfall in the catchment area is 3,666 mm. The average runoff is around 2,339 mm.
The discharge peaks during the rainy seasons in April and November, during which the water level may rise by  overnight, overflowing river banks and flooding the nearby areas.

The river originates near the center of Borneo, south from the Indonesian-Malaysian border, in the joint between the western slope of the Müller Mountain Range, which runs through the island center, and the southern slope of the Upper Kapuas Range, which is located more to the west. For about  it flows through a mountainous terrain and then descends to a marshy plain. About  from the source, near the northern shore of the river, lies a system of Kapuas Lakes which are connected to the river by numerous channels. These lakes are Bekuan (area 1,268 hectares), Belida (600 ha), Genali (2,000 ha), Keleka Tangai (756 ha), Luar (5,208 ha), Pengembung (1,548 ha), Sambor (673 ha), Sekawi (672 ha), Sentarum (2,324 ha), Sependan (604 ha), Seriang (1,412) Sumbai (800 ha), Sumpa (664) and Tekenang (1,564 ha). This outflow prevents massive flooding of the lower reaches of the river; it also promotes fish migration from the river to the lakes for spawning, but drives birds away from the lakes.

The delta is located west-southwest of Pontianak, the capital of West Kalimantan province, which lies at the equator. The delta has five arms, of which the northernmost one is the widest, and is therefore called the Big Kapuas. The largest tributary is the Melawi River, which occurs to the left near the city of Sintang, about 465 km from the mouth. Other major tributaries are the Landak, Kubu, Punggur and Sekayam rivers.

Climate

Flora and fauna 

In the upper and middle reaches, the river flows through dense tropical forests; the rich flora and fauna are the subject of international research. Discoveries of new species are frequent, such as of the Kapuas mud snake (Enhydris gyii), which was discovered in 2003–2005 by German and American herpetologists. This species is remarkable in that it can spontaneously change its skin color, similar to the chameleon.

Otters and crocodiles are common in the Kapuas River, but frogs are nearly absent. Agile gibbons (Hylobates agilis), Müller's Bornean gibbons (Hylobates muelleri), Prevost's squirrels (Callosciurus prevostii) and treeshrews inhabit the trees above the river.

There are two national parks on the river banks, Betung Kerihun with an area of 8,000 km2 and Danau Sentarum (area 1,320 km2), the latter includes the Kapuas Lakes.

Fish

About 300 species of fish have been identified in the river basin, of which 234 are of high economical value. This is more fish species than any other river basin in Indonesia. They belong to 120 genera and 40 families with the two major groups being cyprinids and catfish. More than 30% of the species originate from the sea and inhabit the delta areas. Among the economically important species are food fish such as Pangasius catfish, giant gourami, kissing gourami, snakeheads and large barbs (Leptobarbus, Puntioplites, Tor and others), and species from the aquarium trade such as the super red arowana and rasboras. Because of overfishing and habitat degradation, several species are threatened. Among these are the endangered arowana and white-edge freshwater whipray, and the wallago catfish, which formerly migrated in large groups in the Kapuas River.

Part of the high species diversity in the Kapuas is related to the many different habitats in the river basin. In the headwaters are fast-flowing highland streams, typically dominated by small loaches, and small —often acidic (blackwater)— forest streams and peat swamps with species such as the tiny Sundadanio rasboras and macropodusine gouramis. The main river itself also includes several habitats, ranging from the nearshore to open waters. In the deepest sections, no light exists and in one species, Lepidocephalus spectrum, this has resulted in a complete reduction of both eyes and pigmentation (similar to cavefish).

Owing to the warm climate and abundance of food, most fishes breed all through the year with only a few species like fire eel (Mastacembelus erythrotaenia) having certain reproduction periods. The number of individuals per species is relatively low. The large variety of species may be explained by the fact that some 6,000 years ago, the Kapuas River, as a tributary of the Sunda River, was connected to other tributary rivers of South Sumatra, Java and Malay Peninsula. Apart from fish, there are numerous crabs, prawns, water striders and other aquatic insects. The rich flora and fauna results in very complex food chains, with fishes consuming foods ranging from fruits to other fish. For example, Hemirhamphodon pogonognathus feeds exclusively on terrestrial insects. Abundant fruits and seeds enter the river after falling from large trees which bend over its waters. The feeding habits of the fish in the Kapuas River are distributed as follows: 54% are omnivores; 36% are carnivorous and eat other fish (14%), insects (5%) and mixed small forest animals (17%). The remaining 10% are herbivorous, with 4% of them specialising in algae.

Transport and economic value 
The Kapuas River is the major waterway connecting the center of the island with its western coast. The large river width and depth (up to 27 meters) support intensive cargo and passenger shipping over most of the river length. Ships with a draft of up to 3 meters can navigate up to Sintang, 465 km from the mouth, and those with a draft up to 2 meters can reach the town of Putussibau (902 km from the mouth). Logging and rafting of timber occur all along the river. Fishing is also common, especially at the Kapuas Lakes and near the river delta. The Tayan Bridge, opened in 2016, crosses over the river and is the longest bridge in Kalimantan. Another major bridge over the area is the Kapuas I Bridge. In 2022, the local government decided to build a newer bridge to accommodate increased traffic in commuters and goods, located to be in parallel with existing bridge.

See also
 Geography of Indonesia
 Mae Klong
 Chao Phraya River

References

Bibliography
MacKinnon, Kathy The ecology of Kalimantan, Oxford University Press, 1996, 

Rivers of West Kalimantan
Landforms of West Kalimantan
Rivers of Indonesia